Syed Zameer Akhtar Naqvi also known as Zameer Hassan Naqvi, was a Pakistani writer, poet and religious scholar born in Lucknow, British India, and permanently moved to Karachi, Pakistan, in 1967.

He was a scholar, writer, and researcher and had written multiple books on religion and poetry. He was the editor of Al Kalam magazine besides heading the Anees Academy.

Education
He studied at Lucknow until graduation. He did his matriculation at Hussain School Lucknow and intermediate at Government Jubilee College Lucknow.

He received his post graduate degree from the Shia College Lucknow.

Death
He died at age 80 years on 13 September 2020 in Aga Khan University Hospital, Karachi due to cardiac arrest after a prolonged illness.

Funeral prayer was held at Imam Bargah Shuhda-e-Karbala, Ancholi, and he was buried in Wadi-e-Hussain graveyard in Karachi.

Books
He authored more than 300 books on various subjects, including Urdu poetry, Islamic history, literature, culture, religion, philosophy, sociology, science, oratory, languages, journalism, events of Karbala, and current affairs..

Awards
 On compilation of the book Josh Malih-Abadi's Marthiyah, Mir Anees Award was awarded in 1989
 Commonwealth award, London by Anjuman-e-Farogh-e-Aza in 1999

See also
 Mir Anees
 Kalbe Sadiq

References

Pakistani poets
Urdu-language poets from Pakistan
1944 births
2020 deaths
Indian emigrants to Pakistan
Muhajir people
Writers from Lucknow